Two ships of the Royal Navy have been named HMS Lavender:

  was an  launched in 1915 and sunk in 1917
 

Royal Navy ship names